Initial college football broadcasts on the Fox network were limited to selected bowl games, beginning with the Cotton Bowl Classic from 1999 to 2014. From 2006 to 2009, Fox broadcast the Bowl Championship Series (excluding games played at the Rose Bowl stadium, whose rights were held by ABC under a separate agreement). Fox also holds rights to the Redbox Bowl and Holiday Bowl.

Coverage history

Cotton Bowl Classic

The Fox network acquired its first college football telecast in 1998, when it obtained the broadcast rights to the annual Cotton Bowl Classic held each January on (eventually, the day after) New Year's Day; the first game to be shown on the network as part of the deal was held on January 1, 1999. Fox renewed its contract to carry the game in 2010, in a four-year agreement that ran through the 2013 NCAA college football season.

Fox lost the rights to the Cotton Bowl to ESPN for the 2015 edition, as the cable network holds the television contract to all six bowl games that encompass the College Football Playoff system under a twelve-year deal worth over $7.3 billion. The Cotton Bowl was the only game among the six that was not already broadcast by ESPN.

Bowl Championship Series 

From the 2006 through the 2009 seasons, Fox held the broadcast rights to most of the games comprising the Bowl Championship Series (BCS) – including the Sugar Bowl, the Fiesta Bowl and the Orange Bowl, as well as the BCS Championship Game. Fox paid close to $20 million per game for the rights to televise the BCS games. The network's contract with the BCS excluded any event in the series that was held at the Rose Bowl stadium, such as the Rose Bowl Game and the 2010 BCS National Championship Game, as ABC already had a separate arrangement with the Pasadena Tournament of Roses Association to serve as the broadcaster for the games.

ESPN, which is majority owned by ABC's corporate parent The Walt Disney Company and serves as the producer for all of ABC's sports coverage, would displace Fox outright as the broadcaster of the BCS beginning in the 2010–11 season. This left the Fox network with only the Cotton Bowl Classic as the sole college football game, to which it held the television rights until the 2013–14 season.

Fiesta Bowl

Orange Bowl

Sugar Bowl

BCS National Championship Game

Holiday Bowl

The bowl has been broadcast by Mizlou (1978–1984), Lorimar (1985), ESPN (1986–2016), and Fox Sports 1 (2017–present). On June 15, 2017, it was revealed that the Holiday Bowl had not renewed its contract with ESPN—one of the network's longest relationships—and had entered into an agreement to move to FS1 beginning 2017.

Redbox Bowl

From 2002 through 2015, the bowl was televised by ESPN or ESPN2; since 2016, it has been carried by Fox.

See also
CBS college bowl game broadcasts
NBC college bowl game broadcasts

References

External links
Fiesta Bowl Numbers Game
Orange Bowl Numbers Game - Sports Media Watch

Lists of college football bowl broadcasters
College bowl game broadcasts
Fox Broadcasting Company original programming
College football television series